Children and Libraries is a triannual peer-reviewed academic journal covering library services to children. It is the official journal of the Association of Library Service to Children, and a journal of American Library Association.

The journal was established in 2003 and succeeds the Journal of Youth Services (formerly Top of the News), which was published until 2002 in collaboration with the Young Adult Library Services Association.

Competencies for Librarians Serving Children in Public Libraries
services
programs
outreach
collection development
administrative practices that contribute to quality library service for youth

References

External links
 

Library science journals
Publications established in 2003
Triannual journals
Academic journals published by learned and professional societies
English-language journals